Chauliocheilos saxatilis is a species of armored catfishes native to South America. This species occurs Rio Itamarandiba in upper Rio Jequitinhonha basin, southeastern Brazil. This species is the only known member of its genus.

References

Loricariidae
Fish of Brazil
Catfish genera
Freshwater fish genera
Taxa named by Fernanda de Oliveira Martins
Taxa named by Alaina Cristine Rosa
Taxa named by Francisco Langeani-Neto
Fish described in 2014